Erebostrota is a genus of moths of the family Erebidae. The genus was described by Warren in 1899.

Species
Erebostrota albipicta Schaus, 1914
Erebostrota amans Walker, 1858
Erebostrota calais Schaus, 1914
Erebostrota ochra Dognin, 1912
Erebostrota stenelea Stoll, 1780

References

External links
"Taxonomy - Erebostrota (Genus)". UniProt. Retrieved June 10, 2020.
"Erebostrota Warren, 1889". Global Biodiversity Information Facility. Retrieved June 10, 2020.

Calpinae